Corymbia blakei, commonly known as the ghost gum, is a species of tree that is endemic to Queensland. It has smooth bark, sometimes with a stocking of rough bark on older specimens, linear to narrow lance-shaped adult leaves, flower buds usually in groups of three, creamy white flowers and barrel-shaped, cup-shaped or cylindrical fruit.

Description
It has smooth, powdery white to creamy grey bark, with a short stocking of rough, tessellated, dark grey bark at the base of older specimens. Flowering has been recorded in December and the flowers are creamy white.

Taxonomy and naming
Corymbia blakei was first formally described in 1995 by Ken Hill and Lawrie Johnson from specimens collected by Stanley Thatcher Blake in 1936. The specific epithet (blakei) honours the collector of the type specimens.

Distribution and habitat
This ghost gum is endemic to an area in arid South West and Central West Queensland, extending from the Cory Range south west of Winton to the upper Paroo and Bulloo River area between Charleville and Quilpie.

Conservation status
This eucalypt (as C. blakei subsp. blakei) is classified as of "least concern" under the Queensland Government Nature Conservation Act 1992.

See also
 List of Corymbia species

References

blakei
Myrtales of Australia
Flora of Queensland
Plants described in 1995